Duane Xavier "Dee" Pillette (July 24, 1922 – May 6, 2011) was an American professional baseball pitcher, who played all or part of eight seasons in Major League Baseball (MLB) for four different teams from 1949 through 1956. He attended Santa Clara University.

Born in Detroit, Michigan, Duane Pillette was a second-generation major league pitcher as his father, Herman Pillette, hurled for the Cincinnati Reds and Detroit Tigers between the 1917 and 1924 seasons. Herman won a career-high 19 games in 1922, the year Duane was born.

Pillette entered the majors in 1949 with the New York Yankees, playing for them for two years. In his rookie season, he posted a 2–4 record and a 4.34 earned run average (ERA) in 12 games for the World Champion Yankees.

During the 1950 midseason, New York sent Pillette to the St. Louis Browns along with Jim Delsing, Don Johnson, Snuffy Stirnweiss,and cash considerations in exchange for Tom Ferrick, Joe Ostrowski, and Leo Thomas. In 1951, while pitching for the Browns, Pillette led the American League (AL) in losses with 14, joining his father Herm, who also led the league with 19 losses while pitching for the 1923 Tigers.

Pillette pitched for the Browns until 1953, and was part of the Orioles from 1954 to 1955 after the franchise moved to Baltimore, Maryland. He was the last starting pitcher in the final Browns game, suffering the loss in an eleven-inning pitching duel against Billy Pierce and the Chicago White Sox, when Minnie Miñoso knocked in the winning run in the top of the eleventh in a 2–1 game. Then, in 1954 he became the first winning pitcher in Orioles history after throwing a complete game, 3–2 victory against the Detroit Tigers.

Pillette opened 1956 with the Buffalo Bisons of the International League, being traded to the Philadelphia Phillies late in the season. After that, he pitched in the minors until 1960.

Pillette was a longtime resident of San Jose, California; on May 6, 2011, he died at the age of 88.

Pitching statistics

See also
List of second-generation Major League Baseball players

References

External links

Duane Pillette at SABR (Baseball BioProject)

1922 births
2011 deaths
Baltimore Orioles players
Baseball players from Detroit
Baseball players from San Jose, California
Kansas City Blues (baseball) players
Major League Baseball pitchers
Miami Marlins (IL) players
Newark Bears (IL) players
New York Yankees players
Oakland Oaks (baseball) players
Philadelphia Phillies players
Portland Beavers players
St. Louis Browns players
Salt Lake City Bees players
San Francisco Seals (baseball) players
Santa Clara University alumni
Seattle Rainiers players